The Rude Awakening Show is a United States morning radio talk show that airs from 6am until 10am weekdays on WOCM, a radio station based in Ocean City, Maryland.  The show is simulcast via IRIE Radio. It is hosted by Chicago-born radio personality David "Bulldog" Rothner.  It premiered on WOCM on January 10, 2005 after a six-year run on St. Maarten radio station Laser 101, one of the four stations of the Philipsburg Broadcasting radio network  The show is broadcast from above Seacrets, a bar, restaurant, and nightclub located in Ocean City.  Because of its location on the Delmarva peninsula the show can be heard in four states: Maryland, Delaware, Virginia and New Jersey.

Overview

The show features a variety of guest interviews from celebrities to politicians, musicians to athletes, psychics to porn stars, doctors and artists. The show also has regular features from adult webmaster Mr. Skin and Drew Curtis from Fark.com. For local listeners, the show features daily surf reports from Lee at Malibu's Surf Shop.

The cast of the show has varied since its premiere. In addition to Bulldog, the show currently features:

 "Coach", Morning Show Director.
 "Big Al Reno", just some guy who doesn't eat fruits & vegetables and has a bad case of the shakes.
 "Marla", Producer & Phone Screener Extraordinaire.
 "Leighton" Moore, station owner.

External links
Ocean98.com, WOCM official site
BulldogRadio.com, Bulldog's official site
Seacrets.com, Seacrets' official site
SeacretsLive.com official entertainment site for Seacrets

Rude Awakening Show
2005 radio programme debuts